Manipuri Pony is a 2013 non-feature Indian Meitei language film scripted by Aribam Gautam and directed by Aribam Syam Sharma. It is produced by Films Division of India. The film won the National Film Award for Best Exploration / Adventure Film (Including sports) at the 60th National Film Awards. The movie was also selected in the Indian Panorama of the 44th International Film Festival of India 2013 and the Mumbai International Film Festival in 2014.

Manipuri Pony was screened at the 8th Manipur State Film Festival 2013. The movie was certified by Central Board of Film Certification in 2012.

Synopsis
Among the many facets of the Manipuri culture, the one that has had the most far-reaching impact internationally has been Sagol Kangjei, the progenitor of the modern game of polo. Introduced to the British in the mid-nineteenth century A.D., it reached the far corners of the globe. Due to the reasons of history and changing values, the Manipuri Pony is today on the brink of extinction and is now an endangered species. Even though the position of the animal today is unenviable, there are many who are still hoping and working to ensure its survival, a trend that underlines the fact that hope is not yet lost.

Accolades
The winner of the National Film Award for Best Exploration / Adventure Film (Including sports) at the 60th National Film Awards, the citation reads, "For tracing and presenting the historical significance of the game of polo which has its origins in Manipur."

References 

2013 films
Films directed by Aribam Syam Sharma
2010s Meitei-language films